Crispin Cider is a hard apple cider company based at and produced in Colfax, California. Imported ciders are produced in Tiverton, Devon, England.

Crispin was formerly located in Minneapolis. The company acquired Fox Barrel Cider in 2010. The purchase included its cidery in Colfax where the company is now headquartered. In early 2011, Crispin began importing a dry English cider, Browns Lane (named after the original Jaguar factory in Coventry), from England. In 2012, Crispin was acquired by MillerCoors a subsidiary of Molson Coors. The founders of Crispin went on to open Copper & Kings American Brandy in 2014.

Ingredients
Sourcing apples from the Pacific Northwest, Crispin uses fresh pressed, unpasteurized pure apple juice, and does not have preservatives or added malt, distilled spirit, or grape alcohol. Three to five apple varieties are used in their main line, mainly Granny Smith, Golden Delicious and Washington. A number of ciders are finished with a specialty sweetener or produced with a particular strain of yeast. All ciders are certified as gluten-free.

Their English cider, Browns Lane, is made with traditional English bittersweet cider apples that are sourced in the Malvern Hills of Worcestershire. It is also gluten-free.

Varieties

12oz bottle products 
Blue Line ciders are sold in four-packs of 12 ounce bottles.
Original
Brut 
Pacific Pear
Blackberry Pear

22oz bottle products 
The Saint
Honey Crisp
Annual Barrel Aged

Kegs products 1/6th & 1/2 BBL 
Original
Pacific Pear
Blackberry Pear

16oz can products 
Original
Browns Lane

Imports 
 Browns Lane: Imported English dry hard cider (British racing green label, 16 ounce can)

Artisanal reserves 
All of the Artisanals are unfiltered ciders produced using various yeasts and are packaged in 22 ounce bottles.
 Honey Crisp: Made with organic honey (yellow label)
 The Saint: Made with Belgian Trappist yeast and organic maple syrup (red label)

References

External links 
  
 The Dogfish Head of Hard Cider, Chow.com
 Start-up Crispin Cider aims to capture biggest slice of hard cider business, Star Tribune
 Joe Heron of Crispin Cider, Heavy Table

American ciders
Companies based in Colfax, California
Food and drink companies established in 2004
American companies established in 2004
2004 establishments in California
Drink companies based in California